Kadal Pura (lit. Sea Pigeon) is a Tamil language historical novel written by Sandilyan. The story is based on the ancient Tamil Chola dynasty. It was named after the fictional ship built by the Chola Commander Karunakara Tondaiman, who later became King Tondaiman. The novel is about the Chola kingdom's invasion of Srivijaya (modern-day Malaysia and Singapore) and Kalinga (currently the state of Orissa). It's a work of historical fiction with a few characters thrown in anachronistically (for example, Emperor Taizu of Jin was born in 1068, but appears in the novel as a 25-year-old).

Dr L. Kailasam continued the story in his victimology-based novel Rajali, and the historical characters of Kadal Pura appeared in Rajali in their old ages.

Main characters
 Illayapallavan (Karunaagara Pallavan)
 Kanchanaa Devi (fictional)
 Manjalazhaki (fictional)
 Balavarman ( fictional) - Manjalazhaki's Father
 Anaabaya Cholan (Kulothunga Chola I)
 Virarajendra Chola
 Ameer (fictional) - Anaabaya cholan's Assistant
 Aguda - Ameer's guru
 Kandiya Thevan - Karunakara Pallavan's Assistant
 Shenthan (fictional) - Karunakara Pallavan's Assistant

References
Indian historical novels
Tamil-language literature
Novels set in the Chola Empire
Tamil novels
Novels by Sandilyan
Indian historical novels in Tamil